Mount Abraham is a  mountain located in Franklin County, Maine. One of Maine's "4,000 footers", it is flanked to the north by Spaulding Mountain.

Watersheds

The northeast side of Mt. Abraham is drained by Rapid Stream, then into the West Branch of the Carrabassett River, the Kennebec River, and into the Gulf of Maine. The southern half of the southwest side drains into Quick Stream, then into the West Branch. The northern half drains into Perham Stream, then into Orbeton Stream, and the Sandy River, another tributary of the Kennebec.

History
The mountain was logged in the late 19th century.  Timber was moved down-slope in ice-covered wooden sluices.  Logs, lumber, and pulpwood were shipped on the narrow-gauge Sandy River and Rangeley Lakes Railroad.

A McDonnell F-101B Voodoo of the 60th Fighter-Interceptor Squadron out of Otis AFB, Massachusetts, crashed onto the mountain after colliding with another F-101B during a cross-country formation flight on 14 November 1967. The two-man crew of No.57-376 ejected with minor injuries and the second aircraft made an emergency landing at Dow AFB.

Access
The summit of Mount Abraham can be reached from the AT via the blue-blazed Mount Abraham Side Trail.

See also
 List of mountains in Maine

References

External links
 maineadventure.net: Mount Abraham Directions

Mountains of Franklin County, Maine
New England Four-thousand footers